Strambino is a comune (municipality) in the Metropolitan City of Turin in the Italian region Piedmont, located about  northeast of Turin.

Strambino borders the following municipalities: Ivrea, Romano Canavese, Caravino, Vestignè, Mercenasco, Vische, and Candia Canavese.

The municipality comprises 4 frazioni: Cerone, Crotte, Carrone, Realizio.

Main sights
The castle, built from the 15th century
Town Hall, in Neoclassicist style
Parish church (mid-18th century)

Twin towns
 Villa del Rosario, Argentina

References

External links
 Official website

Cities and towns in Piedmont
Canavese